This is a list of diplomatic missions in Jamaica. There are currently 27 embassies/high commissions posted in Kingston.

Embassies/High Commissions in Kingston

Other posts in Kingston
 (Delegation)

Montego Bay
 (Consular Office)

Non-resident embassies and high commissions accredited to Jamaica

 (Washington, D.C.)
 (Ottawa)
 (Port-of-Spain)
 (Ottawa)
 (New York City)
 (Washington, D.C.)
 (Washington, D.C.)
 (Helsinki)
 (Santo Domingo)
 (Mexico City)
 (Havana)
 (New York City)
 (Havana)
 (Ottawa)
 (Santo Domingo)
 (Washington, D.C.)
 (Havana)
 (Ottawa)
 (Havana)
 (Brasilia)
 (Ottawa)
 (Havana)
 (Washington, D.C.)
 (Washington, D.C.)
 (Caracas)
 (Mexico City)
 (Brasilia)
 (Havana)
 (Brasilia)
 (Ottawa)
 (Havana)
 (Washington, D.C.)
 (Havana)
 (Havana)
 (Washington, D.C.)
 (Havana)

Closed embassies/high commissions 
  (Unknown) 
 
  (closed in 2014) 
  (closed in 2000)
  (closed in 1993)
  (closed in 2006)

See also
Foreign relations of Jamaica
Visa requirements for Jamaican citizens

References

External links
 Ministry of Foreign Affairs of Jamaica

 
Diplomatic missions
Jamaica